Testa Grigia (French : Tête grise, lit. "grey head") (3,479 m) is a rocky prominence above the Theodul Pass, located on the border between Italy (Aosta Valley) and Switzerland (Valais). It overlooks the Plateau Rosa section of the Theodul Glacier on its east side.

Ascent 
The summit can be reached from Breuil-Cervinia and is the culminating point of the Italian part of the international ski area with Zermatt. A connection with the Klein Matterhorn (3,889 m) over the Theodul Glacier is planned for 2021.

References

External links
Testa Grigia on Hikr

Mountains of the Alps
Alpine three-thousanders
Mountains of Aosta Valley
Mountains of Valais
Italy–Switzerland border
International mountains of Europe
Mountains of Switzerland